Maleivona is an island in the Solomon Islands; it is located in Isabel Province.

References

Islands of the Solomon Islands